Michel Youssef (born 23 June 1960) is a Lebanese épée and foil fencer. He competed at the 1984, 1988 and 1992 Summer Olympics.

References

External links
 

1960 births
Living people
Lebanese male épée fencers
Olympic fencers of Lebanon
Fencers at the 1984 Summer Olympics
Fencers at the 1988 Summer Olympics
Fencers at the 1992 Summer Olympics
Lebanese male foil fencers